Nagayasu (written:  or ) is a masculine Japanese given name. Notable people with the name include:

, Japanese samurai
, Japanese footballer
, Japanese samurai
, Japanese samurai and daimyō

Nagayasu (written:  or ) is also a Japanese surname. Notable people with the surname include:

, Japanese politician
, Japanese politician

Japanese-language surnames
Japanese masculine given names